Yassine Naoum is a Moroccan footballer. He usually plays as midfielder. Naoum is currently with Al Sahel.

Naoum played for FAR in the 2007 CAF Champions League group stages.

References

1984 births
Living people
Moroccan footballers
AS FAR (football) players
Olympic Club de Safi players
Footballers from Casablanca
Moroccan expatriate footballers
Expatriate footballers in Kuwait
Moroccan expatriate sportspeople in Kuwait
Expatriate footballers in the United Arab Emirates
Moroccan expatriate sportspeople in the United Arab Emirates
UAE First Division League players
Al-Taawon (UAE) Club players
Ittihad Khemisset players
Association football midfielders
Al-Sahel SC (Kuwait) players